Suns of Light are an American R&B boy band, originally known as the Boys.

Biography

Originating from Carson, California, the Suns of Light are composed of brothers Khiry, Hakeem, Tajh and Bilal Abdulsamad. Their parents are Angela Satterwhite and Jabari Abdulsamad (formerly Brown).

Their grandmother taught them singing, dancing, and acting. In the summer of 1984, ages 5 to 10 as "The Boys," the group began busking at the Venice Beach boardwalk.

Their first single, "Dial My Heart" became a hit, charting at #1and was soon followed by "Lucky Charm" which also reached #1 on the U.S. R&B chart. The album, produced by Babyface and L.A. Reid, was certified Platinum and peaked at #32 on the Billboard 200.

Their fourth single "Crazy" became their third R&B #1 in the fall of 1990.

In 1992, production began on their third and final studio album, The Saga Continues. The album was a critical and commercial failure, reaching only #191 on the Billboard 200.

Members
 Khiry "Khiry the King" Abdulsamad (born November 10, 1973)
 Hakeem "Hak/Hakim" Abdulsamad (born March 26, 1975) - starred in Ernest Goes to Camp", "Wildcats and voiced Franklin in This Is America, Charlie Brown.
 Tajh "TJ" Abdulsamad (born December 8, 1976)
 Bilal "Baby B" Abdulsamad (born April 17, 1979)

Discography

Albums

Singles

References

Sibling quartets
American contemporary R&B musical groups
American boy bands
Child musical groups
New jack swing music groups
Vocal quartets
Musical groups established in 1984
Musical groups from California
Motown artists